The Abel Allen House is a historic house located in Weston, Massachusetts.

Description and history 
With a construction history that is believed to date back to the last decade of the 17th century, the -story wood-frame house is claimed to be the oldest building in Weston. The house was extensively rehabilitated in 1961, at which time the restorer identified at least six different phases of construction. The first was c. 1696, in which a "half house" was built, three bays wide and two stories high, with a large chimney on one side. A lean-to section was added to this structure's rear c. 1720.

In about 1760, the house was greatly expanded, adding the two rooms on the east side of the chimney, as well as a two-story ell in the northeast. The older leanto section was rebuilt at this time. The final 18th century work was the addition of another shed addition to the northeast c. 1790. Then, in 1929 the shed addition was removed and a two-story ell added to the north face. In 1961, the entire building was restored, and the 1929 ell was replaced with a modern construction.

In addition to its extensive architectural history, the building is notable for at least one of its occupants. Thomas Rand, who acquired the house in 1781 after it was confiscated from its Loyalist owner, was a soldier in the American Revolutionary War who served at the Battles of Lexington and Concord, and a housewright who worked on a number of municipal buildings. He also served on the town's board of selectmen during the Revolutionary War years, and filled other municipal offices as well.

The  house was listed on the National Register of Historic Places on January 9, 1978.

See also
National Register of Historic Places listings in Weston, Massachusetts
List of the oldest houses in Massachusetts

References

Houses completed in 1696
Houses on the National Register of Historic Places in Middlesex County, Massachusetts
Houses in Weston, Massachusetts
1696 establishments in Massachusetts